From G's to Gents is an American reality television series aired on MTV, which features  misdirected young men willing to change their lives and become gentlemen. The show is hosted by Fonzworth Bentley, and premiered on MTV on July 15, 2008. The objective of the show is to make the transformation from a roughneck to a sophisticated gentleman within the given time. The second season premiered on February 10, 2009.

Voting process
The voting procedure differs from other voting processes, due to the use of an "Ebony Sphere" or "Black Ball" to decide the fate of other cast members. Each player places a BlackBall in the corresponding box labeled with an opposing players name. At that time, the two (or more) players with the most votes are taken in front of Fonzworth Bentley. The chosen players are then assessed, and Bentley alone makes the final decision.

Season information

References 

2008 American television series debuts
2009 American television series endings
2000s American reality television series
English-language television shows
MTV reality television series
African-American reality television series
Television series by 51 Minds Entertainment